Ulrich Hahn (born 5 November 1955 in Elbingerode) is an East German luger who competed from the mid-1970s to the early 1980s. He won two gold medals in the men's doubles event at the FIL World Luge Championships (1974, 1981).

He also won four medals in the men's doubles event at the FIL European Luge Championships with three silvers (1973, 1978, 1980) and one bronze (1975).

Competing in two Winter Olympics, he earned his best finish of fourth in the men's doubles event at Lake Placid, New York in 1980.

, Hahn is track manager of the bobsled, luge, and skeleton track in Altenberg, Germany.

His wife, Christine Scheiblich, won the gold medal in the women's single sculls at the 1976 Summer Olympics in Montreal, Quebec.

References
FIBT World Championships 2008 in Altenberg, Germany featuring Hahn as track manager. - Accessed July 1, 2007.
Hickok sports information on World champions in luge and skeleton.
List of European luge champions 
Sports-reference.com profile
Wallenchinsky, David. (1984). "Luge: Men's Two-seater". In The Complete Book the Olympics: 1896-1980. New York: Penguin Books. p. 576.

See also

1955 births
German male lugers
Living people
Lugers at the 1976 Winter Olympics
Lugers at the 1980 Winter Olympics
Olympic lugers of East Germany
People from the Harz
20th-century German people